The 1905 The Citadel Bulldogs football team represented The Citadel as an independent during the 1905 college football season. This was the first year of intercollegiate football at The Citadel, and the team hired Syd Smith to be the team's first coach. The Board of Visitors would not permit the cadets to travel outside the city of Charleston for games, and all games are believed to have been played at Hampton Park at the site of the old race course.

Schedule

References

Citadel
The Citadel Bulldogs football seasons
Citadel Bulldogs football